Shih (born 29 November 1950 in Taipei, Taiwan) is a naturalized Austrian composer. Shih has been living and working in Vienna since 1974. In Europe Shih forgoes his full Chinese name due to experience with incorrect writing and pronunciation. However, in Taiwan he is still known by his full name Shih Chieh (Chinese 施捷).

Life and career 
Shih studied composition and harp at the Vienna University for Music and Performing Arts, graduating in 1983.
He has been living and working in Vienna since 1974 as a freelance composer, teacher, and artistic director of the Pacific Youth Orchestra Vienna, founded in 2002.
He has been awarded special merits for regularly presenting contemporary Austrian music in China.

His own works – chamber music, ballet, lied, orchestra works, opera and oratorio – have been performed in many European und Asian countries, as well as in the United States, and regularly appear both on TV and radio (ORF, ARD, MDR, RAI etc.).
Shih's international breakthrough came with his opera „Vatermord“ ("Death of a Father"), first performed in Dresden in 1994 and followed by performances at Leipzig Oper and in Nuremberg, Erlangen, Vienna and Berlin.

Further important steps include the oratorio, „Lebend’ges Land“, in Münster; the music-installation, "Prayer", in Taiwan (on the occasion of the centennial of the Republic of China); and the open-ended cycle, „Ein Takt für...“ ("A Measure for..."), which established Shih's individual style of transforming psychical processes into music for  all existing instruments, either in solo performance or in combination with others.

Style 
The music critic Dr. Christian Baier has described Shih's intentions as the "search for form as well as formal scepticism, richness of expression as well as absolute restraint and austerity. His music allows the performer rich space for free interpretation".

Shih himself explains: "My music is not traditional, but conscious of tradition. As a composer, I am part of a long tradition, and I have to deal with this tradition. Of course I can turn my back, say farewell to tradition and live wholly for the experiment. But in doing so, one soon becomes lonely – not only as a human being, but also as an artist. It is necessary to be conscious of one’s cultural-historical past to arrive at an artistic, i.e. individual present."

List of compositions 
 1981: Epitaph I (flute, oboe, clarinet and basson)
 1982: Dancing Song – for flute and seven percussion instruments
 1983: Dejaviews (three Dance Pieces for Two) – for Piano
 1983: The Night of 15. August – Symphony in three Movements
 1983: Drei Lieder - 3 poems from Li Ho for Soprano and Piano
 1983: Dance Suite – for strings, flute and harp
 1984: Hera or The Search for Manis - for strings orchestra
 1984: Sonata – for violoncello 
 1987: Nestor’s dream - for flute
 1988: Triptych in L (clarinet, violoncello and piano)
 1989: A Measure for clarinet and piano 
 1989: Spuren. ("Traces") 4 Lieder on poems of Franz Hrastnik for lower voice and piano
 1990: Epitaph II (clarinet, basset, horn, Wagner tuba, 2 bassoons)
 1991: A Measure for flute and organ
 1991: A Measure for piano
 1991: A Measure for violoncello
 1992: A Measure for violin and piano
 1993: A Measure for harp and string quartet
 1994: Vatermord (Death of a Father). Chamber opera in nine episodes
 1995: ...Night falls upon the River (Part I of River-Trilogy). Symphonic music based on themes of Marguerite Duras
 1995: A Measure for alto saxophone and organ
 1996: Crossing the River (Part II of River-Trilogy). Chamber music episode on themes of Marguerite Duras
 1996: The last waltz - for Piano
 1997: Lebend'ges Land / Living Country oratorio for soloists, two mixed choirs, children's choir and orchestra
 1997: Secession. Dialogue for guitar and the other twelve
 1999: A Measure for guitar
 1999: A Measure for saxophone quartet
 2001: A Measure for viola and piano
 2002: A Measure for pi-pa and string quartet
 2004: A Measure for harp
 2004: A Measure for two pianos and two percussion players
 2005: A Measure for clarinet and string quartet
 2005: A Measure for piano and four strings
 2005: A Measure for pi-pa
 2005: The Separation (Part III of River-Trilogy). Symphonic music in one movement based on themes of Marguerite Duras
 2006: A Measure for nine (Violin, viola da gamba, erhu, guitar, pi-pa, lute, clarinet / bass clarinet, Harpsichord, percussions)
 2008: A Measure for saxophone and accordion
 2008: A Measure for any string and three percussion players
 2009: Requiem for piano, string orchestra and membranophones
 2010: Wanderschaft (Wanderings) symphonic song on a poem by Georg Trakl for soprano and chamber orchestra
 2011: Prayer – sound installation for a vocalist, two female choirs, two children’s choirs, orchestra and 72 timpani
 2012: A Measure for six percussion instruments and one player (marimba, vibraphone, crotales set, 3 bongos, cymbal, conga)
 2015: Silent Sea, sound installation for large orchestra, mixed choir and children's choir
 2015: Dancing Sea, sound installation for 11 players
 2018: Clouds and Waves, sound sculpture for chamber orchestra, mixed choir and children's choir
 2019: A Measure for Tenor Trombone

Prizes and awards 
 1984: Fellowship of Alban Berg Foundation
 1985: Prize-winner in the Composing Competition of the Republic of China
 1994: "Blaue Brücke" Composition Award of Dresden Center for Contemporary Music (for his opera "Vatermord")
 2005: Gold medal for services to the City of Vienna

Selected recordings
 Shih: Kammermusik - Die Überquerung des Flusses; Ein Takt für Neun; Ein Takt für Klavier & 4 Streicher; Wanderschaft; Die Trennung. Anu Komsi (soprano), Annika Vavic (piano), Ensemble "Die Reihe"; National Symphony Orchestra of Taiwan, Georg Fritzsch, Chien Wen-Pin Capriccio (record label), 2010

References

 Portrait in the music information center austria

Austrian male composers
Austrian composers
1950 births
Living people